Paul Goodloe is an American television meteorologist, currently working for The Weather Channel (TWC). Goodloe has been with TWC since 1999.

He currently co-anchors Weekend Recharge with Dr. Greg Postel and is a field reporter.

Early career and education
Before coming to TWC Goodloe worked at KSDK-TV, KRIV, and KSBY-TV as a broadcast meteorologist. He received an undergraduate degree in geography at The University of Texas at Austin and a master's degree in climatology from the University of California, Berkeley.

Accreditations
Goodloe is a member of The American Meteorological Society (AMS), The National Weather Association (NWA), and The National Association of Black Journalists

See also
 List of personalities on The Weather Channel

References

External links
 Facebook page

American television meteorologists
African-American television personalities
The Weather Channel people
Living people
Television personalities from New Rochelle, New York
Scientists from New York (state)
1968 births
21st-century African-American people
20th-century African-American people